

Fishes

Newly named jawless vertebrates

Newly named placoderms

Newly named cartilaginous fishes

Newly named bony fishes

Notes

References 

2010 in paleontology